The Irish Formula Ford Championship, which is affiliated to Motorsport Ireland is run on various Irish circuits including Mondello Park, Kirkistown, Phoenix Park Motor Racing Circuit and Nutts Corner.

Championship Winners 
 1978 - Michael Roe
 1979 - Colin Lees
 1980 - Maurice Dunne
 1981 - Arnie Black

Motorsport in Ireland
Motorsport